The 2006–07 Edmonton Oilers season began on October 5, 2006. It was the Oilers' 35th season, 28th in the NHL. After making it to the 2006 Stanley Cup Finals, the club had a disappointing season, finishing out of the playoffs.

Prior to the season the club experience the stunning loss of star defenceman Chris Pronger.  After helping the Oilers to the Stanley Cup final in the 2005–06 season, Pronger requested a trade due to personal reasons.  In early July, Pronger was sent to the Anaheim Ducks for Joffrey Lupul, Ladislav Smid and various draft picks.

Not only did Pronger leave, but another major acquisition from the previous season, Michael Peca, was signed by the Toronto Maple Leafs as a free agent. Despite the losses in personnel, the Oilers had a very strong start to the season, briefly propelling them to the top of the Northwest Division standings. The Oilers would slowly fall back of the pack however, finding themselves well out of a playoff spot by the trade deadline.

At the deadline, the Oilers again stunned the NHL by trading their leading scorer, and pending Unrestricted free agent, Ryan Smyth to the New York Islanders for two prospects and a first-round draft pick. Reports later indicated that Smyth and the Oilers were only $100,000 apart in contract negotiations when the Oilers chose to make the trade.

On the same night as the Smyth trade, the Oilers retired former captain Mark Messier's number 11 sweater. The celebration of Messier also included having a street named after him in Edmonton. Oilers general manager, and Messier's former teammate, Kevin Lowe was noticeably absent from the retirement ceremony. Messier won five Stanley Cups with the Oilers during his time in Edmonton.

The Oilers set new marks in this season for both success and failure. Edmonton recorded its 1,000th regular season win in the NHL on January 2, 2007, while late in the season, the Oilers lost 12 consecutive games, a mark that surpassed Edmonton's previous record of 11. However, the NHL does not now consider an overtime loss a true loss, thus the feat did not officially break the franchise record for losses.

In May 2007, Daryl Katz offered $145 million towards the purchase of the team. Sources close to the Edmonton Journal state that, as part of the deal, the team will remain in Edmonton.  No negotiations took place as the owners immediately responded that the Oilers were not for sale.

Regular season
Excluding shootout goals scored, the Oilers had the fewest goals scored of all 30 NHL teams, with just 192.

Season standings

Schedule and results

Playoffs
The Oilers were eliminated from playoff contention for the third time in their last five seasons.  With the Carolina Hurricanes also failing to qualify for the post-season, it marked the first time in NHL history that the previous season's finalists both failed to qualify for the playoffs.

Player statistics

Skaters
Note: GP = Games played; G = Goals; A = Assists; Pts = Points; PIM = Penalty minutes

†Denotes player spent time with another team before joining Edmonton.  Stats reflect time with the Oilers only.
‡Denotes player traded mid-season

Goaltenders
Note: GP = Games played; Min = Minutes played; W = Wins; L = Losses; OT = Overtime/shootout losses; GA = Goals against; SO = Shutouts; SV% = Save percentage; GAA = Goals against average

Awards and records

Records
2:01: New Oilers record for fastest hat trick by Ryan Smyth on October 12, 2006.

Milestones

Transactions

Trades

Free agents acquired

Free agents lost

From waivers

Players re-signed

Draft picks
Edmonton's picks at the 2006 NHL Entry Draft in Vancouver. The Oilers did not draft a player until the 45th pick.

References

Game log: Edmonton Oilers game log on espn.com
Team standings: NHL standings on espn.com
Player Stats: Edmonton Oilers 2006–07 Reg. Season Stats on espn.com
Draft Picks: 2006 NHL Entry Draft

2006–07 NHL season by team
2006–07 in Canadian ice hockey by team
2006-07